Statistics of the Scottish Football League in season 1998–99.

Scottish First Division

Scottish Second Division

Scottish Third Division

See also
1998–99 in Scottish football

References

 
Scottish Football League seasons